Khady Sylla (Dakar, March 27, 1963 – Dakar, October 8, 2013) was a Senegalese writer of two novels, short work, and filmmaker.

Life
Born in Dakar, she studied at the École Normale Supérieure where she became interested in a literary career. She later became one of a small number of African women film makers. Her An Open Window won a first film prize at the Marseille Festival of Documentary Film . She was one of several Senegalese filmmakers mentored by French ethnologist Jean Rouch. She was the older sister of the filmmaker Mariama Sylla, with whom she co-directed the film Une simple parole.

Works

Novels
Le Jeu de la Mer [The Game of the Sea]. Paris: L'Harmattan, 1992. 

Films
Les Bijoux-(1997), Short film
Colobane Express (1999), docu-drama about the passengers of a Senegalese bus.
Une fenêtre ouverte (2005), documentary short (52 min.)
Une simple parole (2014)

References

External links 
Khady Sylla: An author from Senegal writing in French
Howard University, a brief mention along with other artists

Senegalese novelists
Senegalese film directors
1963 births
2013 deaths
People from Dakar
Senegalese writers in French
Senegalese women writers
Academic staff of Cheikh Anta Diop University
20th-century novelists
20th-century women writers